Holbein is an organized hamlet in Saskatchewan that lies within the Rural Municipality of Shellbrook No. 493.

Demographics 

References

External links
Holbein, Saskatchewan Community Profile

Designated places in Saskatchewan
Organized hamlets in Saskatchewan
Shellbrook No. 493, Saskatchewan
Division No. 16, Saskatchewan